Congress Avenue is a  long north–south arterial road serving central Palm Beach County, Florida. A  section from Palm Springs to Palm Beach International Airport encompasses Florida State Road 807 (SR 807), while the remaining southern section is officially known––but seldom referenced to––as County Road 807 (CR 807). In addition, a segment north of the airport exists without state or county designation.

Congress Avenue, like the paralleling Military Trail and Jog Road, is a popular commuting alternative to often-congested Interstate 95, Florida's Turnpike, and U.S. Route 1 in Palm Beach County.

Route description

County Road 807
Congress Avenue and CR 807 begin at the intersection with Yamato Road (SR 794), near the Boca Raton Tri-Rail Station. Proceeding north, it intersects exit 50 of I-95 and a park & ride via a connecting segment. The road jogs east, becoming increasingly closer to the interstate highway as the roads continue north. The road passes through Delray Beach and Boynton Beach, serving a number of malls, shopping centers, and local businesses, especially concentrated around Atlantic Avenue (SR 806) and Boynton Beach Boulevard (SR 804). In Boynton, the road intersects Gateway Boulevard near the Renaissance Commons, a shopping center and restaurant locale built on the former site of a Motorola plant.

In Lake Worth, the next major intersection, is with Hypoluxo Road, which leads to a number of public schools. The busy intersection with Congress and County Road 812 (Lantana Road) sits at the southwest corner of Palm Beach County Park Airport, locally known as Lantana Airport. Now in Lantana, the boulevard passes the JFK Medical Center. At Lake Worth Road (SR 802), CR 807 and SR 807 begins (this transition previously occurred at Lantana Road).

Although the county road segment is the longest, the county road designation itself is rarely referred to when giving verbal directions.

State Road 807
State Road 807 begins at the intersection with Lake Worth Road (SR 802). On the southeastern corner is a local campus of Palm Beach State College. Proceeding north, SR 807 enters Palm Springs and intersects Forest Hill Boulevard (SR 882) before clipping the western corner of Glen Ridge and entering West Palm Beach. SR 807 terminates at an interchange with Southern Boulevard (US 98 / SR 80). The road continues northeast towards Palm Beach International Airport as Australian Avenue (County Road 704A), but another segment of Congress Avenue exists north of the airport, parallel to Australian.

Local segment
Another section of Congress Avenue exists north of the airport. It begins at Belvedere Road in West Palm Beach, just north of the airport. In the neighborhood of Palm Beach Lakes, the road crosses underneath Interstate 95 and proceeds parallel to the east. Congress Avenue terminates at Northlake Boulevard in North Palm Beach. This segment is s long and has no state or county road designation.

Major intersections

References

External links

807
807
807